Dorcadion fulvum is a species of beetle in the family Cerambycidae. It was described by Scopoli in 1763, originally under the genus Cerambyx. It is known from central and eastern Europe.

Subspecies
 Dorcadion fulvum erythropterum Fischer von Waldheim, 1823
 Dorcadion fulvum fulvum (Scopoli, 1763)

References

fulvum
Beetles described in 1763
Taxa named by Giovanni Antonio Scopoli